Festival is a 2005 British black comedy film about a number of people at the Edinburgh Festival Fringe directed by Annie Griffin. The general shots of the festival were filmed during the 2004 event.

Main characters and sub plots
The characters' stories become interconnected.

Faith (Lyndsey Marshal) arrives in Edinburgh to put on her one-person play about Dorothy Wordsworth. She finds companionship with Brother Mike (Clive Russell), who is performing a show about paedophile priests, before eventually revealing himself as one.
Tommy O'Dwyer (Chris O'Dowd) - an Irish stand-up, who tries to seduce local radio host Joan Gerrard (Daniela Nardini). 
Sean Sullivan (Stephen Mangan) - famous comedian. He antagonises many people, especially Gerrard and his fellow jurors at the Comedy Awards. His alcoholic assistant, Petra (Raquel Cassidy), feels particularly put-upon.
Joan Gerard (Daniela Nardini) - local radio host covering the festival. An early argument with Sullivan during a live radio interview sets the tone for their antagonistic relationship. She is also a juror for the Comedy Awards. Sullivan taunts her during the discussion sessions because of her acquaintance with O'Dwyer, who is nominated. 
Nicky Romanowski (Lucy Punch) - ambitious young hack comedian and Award nominee.
Micheline Menzies (Amelia Bullmore) - wife of an Edinburgh lawyer who is suffering from post natal depression, and runs off with a Canadian fringe festival actor Rick (Jonah Lotan).

External links
Annie Griffin on Festival
BBC.co.uk - links to professional reviews
Future Movies Interview with Annie Griffin
 

2005 films
Scottish films
Edinburgh Festival
English-language Scottish films
Films set in Edinburgh
Films shot in Edinburgh
2000s English-language films